Provincial elections are scheduled to be held in Balochistan within 60 days after the dissolution of the Provincial Assembly, which is set to dissolve in August 2023, unless dissolved earlier: in which case the election shall be held within 90 days after dissolution. This means that the election must be held by or before 12 October 2023.

Electoral system 
The 65 seats of the Balochistan Assembly consist of 51 general seats, whose members are elected by the first-past-the-postvoting system through single-member constituencies. 11 seats are reserved for women and 3 seats are reserved for non-Muslims. The members on these seats are elected through proportional representation based on the total number of general seats secured by each political party.

Background 
In the 2018 election, the newly formed Balochistan Awami Party (BAP), created by former members of Pakistan Muslim League (Q) (PML-Q) and Pakistan Muslim League (N) (PML-N), emerged as the largest party in the province by winning 24 seats.

The Muttahida Majlis-e-Amal (MMA) and the Balochistan National Party (Mengal) (BNP-M) became the second and third largest parties by securing 10 seats each.

The Pakistan Tehreek-e-Insaf (PTI) won 7 seats and emerged as the fourth largest party in the province for the very first time.

The PML(N), the Pashtunkhwa Milli Awami Party (PMAP) and the National Party faced their worst ever defeats, as they won one, one, and zero seats, respectively.

Since no party got the majority, the BAP, PTI, Awami National Party (ANP) and Hazara Democratic Party (HDP) formed a coalition government.

On 26 September 2021, a political crisis occurred in the province after a motion of a no-confidence motion was tabled against Chief Minister Jam Kamal Khan Alyani. Alyani resigned on 24 October 2021.

Abdul Quddus Bizenjo became the new Chief Minister on 29 October 2021.

Notes

References

Elections in Balochistan
2023 elections in Pakistan
Balochistan